The Checker Marathon is an automobile produced by the Checker Motors Corporation of Kalamazoo, Michigan, between 1961 and 1982.  It was marketed as a passenger car for consumers, as opposed to the similar Taxi, which was aimed at fleet buyers.

History
Marathons were produced in both four-door sedan and four-door station wagon forms, and the rarer six-door 9-seater and eight-door, 12-seater "Aerobus" sedans and wagons. 

The Marathon was introduced in September 1960 for the 1961 model year, alongside, and later superseding, the Checker Superba Custom and differing from the Superba with its better interior appointments. Originally, it retained the Superba's A10 body code, whereas A9 was the code used for taxis. The exterior of the Marathon had a full-width egg-crate grille, differing from the Superba's narrower grille and inboard parking lights. 

After a minor facelift for 1963, chassis codes changed to A11 for taxis and A12 for passenger versions. Also in 1963,  the Marathon Town Custom, a limousine version on a longer (129 versus 120 in) wheelbase appeared. This version, which seated eight, received the A19E chassis code. A few years later, this was changed to A12E.

Checker did not have a nationwide dealer network and sold most of its production for fleet service.

Technical Changes 
With the exception of United States government-mandated 5 mph bumpers in 1974 and ongoing mechanical changes, the Marathon remained virtually unchanged during its 21-year production run. However, Checker did comply with all safety and emissions requirements while in production. Notably, the Marathon's front suspension A-frames interchange with a 1956 Ford. 

Some of these changes help in identifying the year of a Checker, and included:

 1963: Front parking/directional lamps changed from white to amber
 1964: Standard front lap belts
 1965: Engines switched from Continental inline-6 to Chevrolet OHV-6 and small-block V8s
 1966: Standard front and rear lap belts
 1967: Interior safety package, including energy-absorbing steering column and wheel, padded dash, recessed knobs
 1967: Dual-chamber brake master cylinder
 1968: Side marker lamps on all fenders, amber in front, red in rear (round on all Checkers)
 1968: Front shoulder belts for outboard passengers
 1969: Headrests
 1970: Locking steering column (Checker used full-size Chevrolet steering columns and wheels)
 1974: Larger, heavier silver-painted "girder"-style bumpers
 1975: Catalytic converter required unleaded fuel
 1976: Radiator (AMC Matador), engine (Chevy 350 V8 2-barrel carb, cylinders were over-bored, requiring larger pistons and rings), transmission (TH 400: Turbo Hydra-Matic), differential (Spicer 44), front lower A-frame (Ford 56 Thunderbird), front upper A-frame (63 Lincoln Continental), steering was rear draglink until 1980, pittman arm bushing tends to loosen and should be tightened every 10k miles.
 1978: Parallel action windshield wipers introduced
 1978: New "Delta"-style Chevrolet steering wheel (sans the Chevy bowtie)

Engines 
The engines used were originally Continental-built L-head inline-sixes (OHV units for the wagons), but these were exchanged for Chevrolet sixes and small-block V8s for the 1965 model year. These continued to change as Chevrolet introduced modifications, peaking with the 1969 L-48 350 V8 which produced  (gross). In 1969, a Perkins 4.236 L diesel nonturbo engine was available as an option for all models, but for only one year. For 1980, the engine lineup was changed entirely, with a 3.8-litre V6 replacing the old inline unit, and a smaller 267 ci (4.4 L) standard V8. The big news was the Oldsmobile LF9 engine, a  diesel V8.

End of Production
The final Marathon was manufactured in 1982, when Checker exited the automobile manufacturing business. The company continued operations for an additional 27 years producing body stampings for General Motors, Ford, and Chrysler, until January 2009, when it entered bankruptcy liquidation as a result of the downturn in the USA auto industry.

Fleet Usage

New York City 
For decades, Checker was the taxicab of choice for New York City and many other American cities. The size of the car (seating many passengers), the robust construction, the lack of yearly changes to the styling (Especially the 1958 and later models, simplifying parts management), and the bolt-on rear quarter panels all contributed to the Marathon's ubiquity on the streets of Manhattan. 

The last New York City Checker cab retired in 1999, operated by Earl Johnson from 1978 onwards. The Marathon covered over 750,000 miles and had three engine replacements over the years.

Virtually any film set in New York City in the 1960s, 1970s, and 1980s will show a Checker Marathon. Many movies set in the 1950s and 1960s use Checker cabs built in the 1970s and early 1980s, since the bodies were virtually the same, and due to the lack of usable early specimens. Also, in works depicting the Soviet Union or East Bloc countries, such as the film Gorky Park    and the original Mission: Impossible television series, Checker Marathons were used to depict Soviet-made GAZ-13 Chaika automobiles.

Kalamazoo 
Apart from taxicab use, Marathons were also bought by police departments, most notably in Kalamazoo, where Checker had its factory.

The Vatican 
In the late 1960s and into the early 1970s, some black SCV-plated (Stato Città del Vaticano - Vatican City) A12 Marathons were used to accommodate Pope Paul VI's entourage in motorcades.

References

External links 
 Checker World, official website of Checker Car Club
 The Internet Checker Taxicab Archive
 The ICTA's Checker Taxi Stand, Youtube Channel

1960s cars
1970s cars
1980s cars
Cars of the United States
Marathon
Rear-wheel-drive vehicles
Sedans
Station wagons
Taxi vehicles
Cars introduced in 1961